An American Anarchist: The Life of Voltairine de Cleyre is book written by Paul Avrich. It is a biography of Voltairine de Cleyre.

AK Press republished the title in May 2018.

References

Further reading

External links 

 
 

1978 non-fiction books
American biographies
Books by Paul Avrich
English-language books
Biographies about anarchists
Princeton University Press books
AK Press books